Palur is a village in Kanchipuram district in Tamil Nadu of India.

Palur may also refer to:

Palur, Tiruchirappalli district, India
Palur, Minab, Iran
Palur, Rudan, Iran
Palur railway station, Indonesia